Indian Trail is a suburban town in Union County, North Carolina, United States. A part of the Charlotte metropolitan area, Indian Trail has grown rapidly in the 21st century, going from 1,942 residents in 1990 to 39,997 in 2020. Every Fourth of July the town holds an annual parade which is one of the biggest parades in the Charlotte area.

History
Founded on March 12, 1861, the town holds a history of traders traveling along the "Indian Trail," which ran from Petersburg, Virginia, to the Waxhaw Indians and gold mining areas. Indian Trail was first a farming community; however, German and Scot-Irish and Irish settlers began to move into the area due to its geographical location. In 1874, the Seaboard Coast Line Railroad was built between the cities Charlotte and Monroe. The railroad, which runs through the town, brought prosperity to the area. Indian Trail was incorporated as a town in 1907, with established city limits based upon a one-half mile radius from the intersection of Indian Trail Road and the Seaboard Railroad.

Geography
Indian Trail is located at  (35.076944, -80.669167).

Located in the southern portion of the Piedmont region of North Carolina, Indian Trail is a rapidly growing suburb approximately 10 miles southeast of Charlotte, in Union County. Indian Trail is located in the northwestern portion of Union County, which is among the 10 fastest-growing counties in the United States. It is bordered by seven other municipalities, in addition to unincorporated portions of Union County. Its proximity to Charlotte and the regional transportation network it enjoys should continue to generate growth and development within its boundaries.

Demographics

2020 census

As of the 2020 United States census, there were 39,997 people, 12,743 households, and 10,210 families residing in the town.

2010 census
As of the census of 2010, there were 33,518 people, 11,121 households, and 9,060 families in the town. The population density was 1,545.4 people per square mile. The racial makeup of the town was 81.00% White, 10.0% African American, 0.5% Native American, 1.8% Asian, 0.0% Pacific Islander, 4.4% from other races, and 2.3% from two or more races. Hispanic or Latino of any race were 10.9% of the population.

Of the 11,121 households 48.7% had children under the age of 18 living with them, 66.1% were married couples living together, 10.9% had a female householder with no husband present, and 18.5% were non-families. 18.5% of households were one person and 4.1% were one person aged 65 or older. The average household size was 3.01 and the average family size was 3.35.

The age distribution was 18.9% under 10 years, 15.9% from 10 to 19, 9.6% from 20 to 29, 17.7% from 30 to 39, 17.3% from 40 to 49, 9.9% from 50 to 59, 6.6% from 60 to 69, 2.9% from 70 to 79, and 1.1% who were 80 years of age or older. The median age was 33.7 years. Females make up 50.9% of the population.

The median household income was $66,333. The per capita income for the town was $26,096. About 6.3% of the population is below the poverty line.

Notable industries
 RSC Brands

Notable people
Sam Howell

References

External links
 Official website of Indian Trail, NC
 CNN Article about Indian Trail: "Making a home in one of North Carolina's fastest-growing places" by Jamie Gumbrecht (June 9, 2011)

Towns in North Carolina
Towns in Union County, North Carolina
Populated places established in 1861
1861 establishments in North Carolina